Peter Wong Man-kong  (9 January 1949 – 11 March 2019) was a politician and businessman from Hong Kong.

Business career
After Peter's graduation from University of California, Berkeley in 1971, he returned to Hong Kong in 1972 to help run the company. Wong's businesses operated projects in Shenzhen and Dongguan. 

Wong also served as independent director of various business, including MGM China, New Times Energy, Sino Hotels, and Sun Hung Kai & Company, as well as chairman of several firms, among them MK Corporation, North West Development, Culture Resources Development, Silk Road Hotel Management, and Silk Road Travel Management. He was an executive at the China Chamber of Tourism as well as the Global Tourism Economy Forum, and aided the development of cultural tourism in northwest China. Wong received the Bronze Bauhinia Star in 2003.

Political career
Wong served on the National People's Congress as a representative from Hong Kong from 1993 until his death. During his time in office, he asked for review of the Hong Kong Basic Law, and advised against reliance on foreign judges to hear constitutional legal cases. Wong also proposed several bills relating to national security. He traveled to Beijing on 2 March 2019 to attend the annual meeting of the NPC, only to return to Hong Kong two days later to treat an illness. Wong died on 11 March 2019, at Queen Mary Hospital in Pok Fu Lam, aged 70.

References

1949 births
2019 deaths
Delegates to the 8th National People's Congress from Hong Kong
Delegates to the 9th National People's Congress from Hong Kong
Delegates to the 10th National People's Congress from Hong Kong
Delegates to the 11th National People's Congress from Hong Kong
Delegates to the 12th National People's Congress from Hong Kong
Delegates to the 13th National People's Congress from Hong Kong
University of California, Berkeley alumni
Hong Kong business executives
20th-century Chinese businesspeople
21st-century Chinese businesspeople
Recipients of the Bronze Bauhinia Star
Hong Kong shipping businesspeople
Businesspeople in tourism